Hilda Kay Grant (November 29, 1910 – May 11, 1996) was a Canadian writer and artist, who published both non-fiction work under her own name and novels under the pen name Jan Hilliard.

Biography
She was born in 1910 in Yarmouth, Nova Scotia to English parents, as Hilda Kay. She attended Yarmouth Academy and later studied at the Grand Central School of Art in New York.  During the Second World War, she worked as a secretary in Montreal and Toronto, and in 1945 married fellow Nova Scotian Joseph Howe Grant, a professional engineer. Together they lived first in Toronto and later in Kleinburg north of the city. She disliked being called Hilda and was known to all by her maiden name of Kay.

During her years in Toronto, she was an active member of both the Heliconian Club and the Canadian Authors' Association, and a mentor to many writers and painters.  When the American publishing firm of Abelard-Schuman had a Canadian subsidiary, she was its fiction editor and oversaw many Canadian writers into print.

Grant published her first book, The Salt Box, in her 40s and continued writing for less than twenty years.  Written under the pseudonym Jan Hilliard, The Salt Box won the prestigious Stephen Leacock Memorial Medal for Humour in 1952. The Salt Box was followed by A View of the Town. Miranda and The Jameson Girls were both novels of reminiscence, the latter about the family of a dying rum-runner, which caused some controversy in her hometown. Dove Cottage was based on the author's own house outside Toronto, and Morgan's Castle was set in the fictitious village of Greenwood in the Niagara Peninsula of Ontario.  As The New York Times wrote at the time, "Few such credible and practical murderers have flourished in fiction.  Miss Hilliard persuades one that they are commoner in life… [she] writes a sure sense of atmosphere".

Morgan's Castle was Grant's last novel, although she published three subsequent works of non-fiction under her own name. Robert Stevenson, engineer and sea-builder, was a biography of the lighthouse builder and grandfather of Robert Louis Stevenson. She received a Canadian Centennial Commission grant to research and write Samuel Cunard, Pioneer of the Atlantic Steamship, and was a Canada Council Award recipient.  She also published short stories and poetry in such magazines as Maclean's, Chatelaine and Canadian Poetry. 

A lifelong gardener, even when limited to a balcony in her later years, she co-authored Small City Gardens with William S. Brett in 1967.  She soon left writing forever, returning to her first artistic interest of painting, and in her later years was recognized as an accomplished watercolorist. She often supplied illustrations for her own books.

She died on May 11, 1996 at her home in Toronto and her cremated remains were interred in the Grant family plot in Riverside Cemetery in New Glasgow, Nova Scotia.

Works

Novels
Under the pseudonym Jan Hilliard, she wrote six novels: 
The Salt Box (1951) W. W. Norton,  New York, returned to print in 2009
A View of the Town (1954) Abelard-Schuman, New York
The Jameson Girls (1956) Nelson, Foster, Scott, Toronto
Dove Cottage (1958) Abelard-Schuman, London/New York
Miranda (1960) Abelard-Schuman, London/NY/Toronto, and
Morgan's Castle (1964) Abelard-Schuman, NY, republished by Ace Books (Penguin), 1979, (K-203).

Non-fiction
Samuel Cunard, Pioneer of the Atlantic Steamship (1967) Abelard-Schuman, London
Small City Gardens (coauthored with William S. Brett) (1967) Abelard-Schuman, Toronto
Robert Stevenson, Engineer and Sea-builder (1969) Meredith Press, New York

References

Sources
Skene-Melvin, David, Canadian Crime Fiction, 1817–1996, Toronto, 1996. ISBN (hard cover); ISBN (paperback)

External links
 CANUS HUMOROUS
 1952 Leacock Medal - Writing Lesson

1910 births
1996 deaths
20th-century Canadian novelists
Canadian women novelists
Stephen Leacock Award winners
Canadian garden writers
Canadian biographers
Writers from Nova Scotia
People from Yarmouth, Nova Scotia
Canadian mystery writers
Canadian book editors
20th-century Canadian poets
Canadian women poets
Women biographers
Women mystery writers
Canadian women short story writers
20th-century Canadian women writers
Women humorists
20th-century biographers
20th-century Canadian short story writers
Canadian women non-fiction writers
Pseudonymous women writers
20th-century pseudonymous writers